Paul Stephen Aisen is an American physician and medical researcher. He started his career as a rheumatologist and then made Alzheimer's disease his focus.  As of 2015 he was on the faculty of the Keck School of Medicine of USC and his offices were in San Diego.

Aisen did his undergraduate work in biochemistry and molecular biology at Harvard and obtained his medical degree from Columbia University. He did his residency at Case Western Reserve University and at Mount Sinai Medical Center in New York, and trained further through a fellowship in rheumatology at New York University.  He has a private practice as a GP and rheumatologist in New York, then joined the faculty of Mount Sinai in 1994.  He was recruited to the  Georgetown University School of Medicine in 1999 in neurology and medicine and began focusing his practice and research on Alzheimer's disease there.

In 2007 Aisen was recruited to University of California San Diego to run the Alzheimer's Disease Cooperative Study, which UCSD had established in 1991 and coordinates studies on Alzheimer's disease drugs like solanezumab.   He left UCSD in 2015 because he was unhappy with the level of support that UCSD was providing him and due to USC's offer.  UCSD and USC ended up in litigation over control of the ca. $100 million program and its research data, which involved six ongoing clinical trials and data collected on thousands of clinical trial subjects.  Part of the dispute arose because Aisen's lab had uploaded the data from the ADCS onto Amazon Cloud servers and would not give the passwords to UCSD officials.   USC rented space for Aisen in a San Diego office park, where Keck's Alzheimer's Therapeutic Research Institute is located under Aisen's direction. Some aspects of data management were temporarily settled in 2016; and a settlement was reached in 2019, with USC to pay UCD $50 million compensation and make a public statement that is actions "did not align with the standards of ethics and integrity which USC expects of all its faculty, administrators, and staff."

Aisen has been a strong proponent of the amyloid hypothesis and as of 2017 believed that earlier intervention with drugs against amyloid might show more efficacy than interventions when the disease process is well underway, and has helped initiate large trials to test ways to prevent Alzheimer's disease.

He has served as a consultant or advisor for pharmaceutical companies Eli Lilly and Janssen, smaller biotech companies exploring alternative approaches to AD like Anavex Life Sciences,  Proclara, CohBar, and Neurophage, as well as nonprofits like ACT-AD.  He is a principal investigator in the Alzheimer's Disease Neuroimaging Initiative.

In November 2018 Expertscape recognized Aisen as one of the world's top-ranked experts in Alzheimer's disease. He has an h-index of 107 according to Semantic Scholar.

References

American neuroscientists
Alzheimer's disease researchers
Harvard College alumni
Living people
Columbia University Vagelos College of Physicians and Surgeons alumni
Year of birth missing (living people)